Wizard Sleeve are an American alternative hip hop group from Miami. consisting of rapper/producers Lex One (Alex Cruz), Mike Beatz (Michael Barnett) and DJ/producer Pusher Fm (Pedro Calcano).

Background
The group's name was derived from a popular slang, coined by in the Viz Profanisaurus, and featured in the movie Borat: Cultural Learnings of America for Make Benefit Glorious Nation of Kazakhstan,  used to describe large, hanging or dangling labia.

On October 2, 2008, they were featured in the song "Me Plus You" from the Black Noise EP.01, released through independent record label Southern Fried Records.

The vocals from the release were then dubbed over the electro song "Riverside" by Dutch DJ Sidney Samson. It was released in the UK on January 4, 2010, through Data Records as "Riverside (Let's Go!)".

Discography

Singles

References

External links
Wizard Sleeve Blog

American dance music groups